Igor Penov (born October 5, 1984) is a Macedonian professional basketball player who last played for Pelister.

External links

References

1984 births
Living people
ABA League players
KK MZT Skopje players
Macedonian men's basketball players
Sportspeople from Skopje
Small forwards